Eriocaulon is a genus of about 400 species commonly known as pipeworts, of monocotyledonous flowering plants in the family Eriocaulaceae. The genus is widely distributed, with the centers of diversity for the group occurring in tropical regions, particularly southern Asia and the Americas. A few species extend to temperate regions, with ca. 10 species in the United States, mostly in the southern states from California to Florida, and only two species in Canada; China has 35 species, also mostly southern. Only one species (E. aquaticum) occurs in Europe, where it is confined to the Atlantic Ocean coasts of Scotland and Ireland; this species also occurs in eastern North America and is thought to be a relatively recent natural colonist in Europe. In the Americas, Eriocaulon is the only genus in its family that occurs north of Florida. They tend to be associated with wet soils, many growing in shallow water, in wetlands, or in wet savannas like flatwoods. In wet soils, their abundance appears to be related to water levels, fire frequency, and competition from other plants such as grasses. Experiments have shown that they are weak competitors compared to many other wetland plant species. Some species can persist as buried seeds during unfavorable conditions.  The scientific name is derived from Ancient Greek εριον, meaning 'wool', and καυλός, meaning 'stalk'.

The species are mostly herbaceous perennial plants, though some are annual plants; they resemble plants in the related families Cyperaceae (sedges) and Juncaceae (rushes), and like them, have rather small, wind-pollinated flowers.

Selected species
Names were sourced from official sources including: the Flora of North America, the Flora of China, currently accepted Australian taxa from the Australian Plant Name Index, etc..

 Eriocaulon achiton
 Eriocaulon acutibracteatum
 Eriocaulon aethiopicum
 Eriocaulon albocapitatum
 Eriocaulon aloefolium  – Qld, Australia
 Eriocaulon alpestre
 Eriocaulon angustulum
 Eriocaulon anshiense
 Eriocaulon apetalum
 Eriocaulon aquaticum  – n. Europe & e. North America
 Eriocaulon asteroides
 Eriocaulon athertonense  – Qld, Australia
 Eriocaulon atrum
 Eriocaulon australasicum  – SA, NSW, Vic, Australia
 Eriocaulon australe  – Cambodia, China, W Malaysia, Thailand, Vietnam, NT, Qld, NSW, Australia, Pacific Islands
 Eriocaulon balakrishnanii
 Eriocaulon bamendae
 Eriocaulon baramaticum
 Eriocaulon barbeyanum
 Eriocaulon benthamii
 Eriocaulon bifistulosum  – Qld, Australia
 Eriocaulon bolei
 Eriocaulon brevipedunculatum
 Eriocaulon breviscapum
 Eriocaulon brownianum
 Eriocaulon buergerianum
 Eriocaulon carpentariae  – NT, Qld, Australia
 Eriocaulon carsonii  – SA, Qld, NSW, Australia
 subsp. carsonii – SA, Qld, NSW, Australia
 subsp. euloense  – Qld, Australia
 subsp. orientale  – Qld, Australia
 Eriocaulon cauliferum Makino(1910) - Japan
 Eriocaulon chinorossicum
 Eriocaulon cinereum  – WA, NT, Qld, Australia
 Eriocaulon clarksonii  – Qld, Australia
 Eriocaulon compressum
 Eriocaulon concretum  – WA, NT, Qld, Australia
 Eriocaulon conicum
 Eriocaulon cookei
 Eriocaulon cuspidatum
 Eriocaulon dalzellii

 Eriocaulon decangulare
 Eriocaulon decemflorum
 Eriocaulon depressum  – NT, Qld, Australia
 Eriocaulon dictyophyllum
 Eriocaulon dregei
 Eriocaulon duthiei
 Eriocaulon echinulatum
 Eriocaulon elenorae
 Eriocaulon ermeiense
 Eriocaulon eurypeplon
 Eriocaulon exsertum
 Eriocaulon faberi
 Eriocaulon fistulosum  – WA, NT, Qld, Australia
 Eriocaulon fluviatile
 Eriocaulon fysonii
 Eriocaulon giganticum  – Qld, Australia
 Eriocaulon glabripetalum
 Eriocaulon gregatum
 Eriocaulon henryanum

 Eriocaulon heterolepis
 Eriocaulon hookerianum
 Eriocaulon hydrophilum
 Eriocaulon inapertum  – WA, NT, Australia
 Eriocaulon inyangense
 Eriocaulon kanarense
 Eriocaulon karaavalense
 Eriocaulon karnatakense
 Eriocaulon kathmanduense
 Eriocaulon koernickianum
 Eriocaulon kolhapurense
 Eriocaulon konkanense
 Eriocaulon koynense
 Eriocaulon kunmingense
 Eriocaulon lanceolatum
 Eriocaulon leianthum
 Eriocaulon leptophyllum
 Eriocaulon leucomelas
 Eriocaulon lineare
 Eriocaulon lividum  – Australia
 Eriocaulon longicuspe
 Eriocaulon longifolium
 Eriocaulon longipetalum
 Eriocaulon luzulifolium
 Eriocaulon madayiparense
 Eriocaulon maharashtrense
 Eriocaulon mangshanense
 Eriocaulon margaretae
 Eriocaulon mbalensis
 Eriocaulon meiklei
 Eriocaulon microcephalum
 Eriocaulon minimum
 Eriocaulon minusculum
 Eriocaulon minutum
 Eriocaulon miquelianum
 Eriocaulon monoscapum  – NT, Australia
 Eriocaulon nantoense
 Eriocaulon nanum  – Qld, Australia
 Eriocaulon nematophyllum  – NT, Qld, Australia
 Eriocaulon nepalense
 Eriocaulon nigrobracteatum
 Eriocaulon obclavatum
 Eriocaulon odontospermum  – WA, NT, Qld, Australia
 Eriocaulon odoratum
 Eriocaulon oryzetorum
 Eriocaulon pallidum  – Qld, Australia
 Eriocaulon parkeri
 Eriocaulon parviflorum
 Eriocaulon parvulum
 Eriocaulon parvum
 Eriocaulon patericola  – WA, NT, Australia
 Eriocaulon pectinatum
 Eriocaulon peninsulare
 Eriocaulon pusillum  – WA, NT, Qld, Australia
 Eriocaulon pygmaeum  – WA, NT, Qld, Australia
 Eriocaulon quinquangulare
 Eriocaulon ratnagiricum
 Eriocaulon ravenelii
 Eriocaulon richardianum
 Eriocaulon ritchieanum
 Eriocaulon robustius
 Eriocaulon robustobrownianum
 Eriocaulon robustum
 Eriocaulon rockianum
 Eriocaulon rouxianum
 Eriocaulon sahyadricum
 Eriocaulon santapaui

 Eriocaulon scariosum  – Qld, NSW, ACT, Vic., Australia
 Eriocaulon schimperi
 Eriocaulon schlechteri
 Eriocaulon schochianum
 Eriocaulon schultzii  – NT, Australia
 Eriocaulon sclerophyllum
 Eriocaulon scullionii  – WA, NT, Australia
 Eriocaulon sedgwickii
 Eriocaulon selousii
 Eriocaulon setaceum  – Bangladesh, Cambodia, China, India, Indonesia, Japan, Laos, Myanmar, Sri Lanka, Thailand, Vietnam, WA, NT, Qld, Australia 
 Eriocaulon sexangulare
 Eriocaulon sharmae
 Eriocaulon sivarajanii
 Eriocaulon sollyanum
 Eriocaulon spectabile  – WA, NT, Qld, Australia
 Eriocaulon staintonii
 Eriocaulon stellulatum
 Eriocaulon stipantepalum
 Eriocaulon taishanense
 Eriocaulon talbotii
 Eriocaulon texense
 Eriocaulon thwaitesii
 Eriocaulon tonkinense
 Eriocaulon tortuosum  – WA, NT, Qld, Australia
 Eriocaulon tricornum  – NT, Australia
 Eriocaulon trisectoides
 Eriocaulon truncatum  – Qld, Australia, Asia
 Eriocaulon tuberiferum
 Eriocaulon vandaanamensis
 Eriocaulon viride
 Eriocaulon wightianum
 Eriocaulon willdenovianum  – NT, Qld, Australia
 Eriocaulon xeranthemum
 Eriocaulon zollingerianum  – China, India, Indonesia, Laos, Malaysia, New Guinea, Philippines, Thailand, Vietnam, NT, Qld, Australia

Species accepted by the authoritative Australian Plant Census, informally named, described and published awaiting formal publication
 Eriocaulon sp. C Kimberley Flora (G.J.Keighery 4610) WA Herbarium – WA, Australia
 Eriocaulon sp. E Kimberley Flora (A.S.George 12635) WA Herbarium – WA, Australia
 Eriocaulon sp. G Kimberley Flora (K.F.Kenneally 11374E) WA Herbarium – WA, Australia
 Eriocaulon sp. Harding Range (M.D.Barrett & R.L.Barrett MDB 1826) WA Herbarium – WA, Australia
 Eriocaulon sp. Theda (M.D.Barrett MDB 2063) WA Herbarium – WA, Australia

References

 
Poales genera